"Public Ivy" is an informal term to refer to public colleges and universities in the United States that are perceived to provide a collegiate experience on the level of Ivy League universities. There is no trademark for the term, and the list of schools associated with the classification have changed over time.

The term has was first coined in 1985 by Yale University admissions officer Richard Moll, who published Public Ivies: A Guide to America's Best Public Undergraduate Colleges and Universities. That initial list included eight universities and nine runners-up. In 2001, college guide authors Howard Greene and Matthew Greene, released their own book, The Public Ivies: The Great State Colleges and Universities, which included 30 schools.

Debates about public Ivies have centered on whether state budgetary cuts are undermining their future; whether raising tuition at public Ivies has "gentrified" the schools; whether states should be subsidizing higher education in the first place; whether graduates of public Ivies are able to pay back student loans as quickly as their Ivy League counterparts; and whether out-of-state tuition is too high.

History 
The term first appeared in the Public Ivies: A Guide to America's Best Public Undergraduate Colleges and Universities, published in 1985. The author, Richard Moll, graduated with a master's degree from Yale University in 1959, and served as an admissions officer as well as a director of admissions at several universities in the United States. He traveled the nation examining higher education institutions, and selected eight that were comparable to the Ivy League.

Moll's original ranking methodology included factors such as academic rigor, quality of faculty, and cost of tuition, as well as assessments of campus facilities, available resources, age, and major cultural traditions celebrated at each institution.

Original list published in 1985 
 College of William & Mary (Williamsburg, Virginia)
 Miami University (Oxford, Ohio)
 University of California (applies to the campuses as of 1985: Berkeley, Los Angeles, San Diego, Irvine, Davis, Santa Barbara, Santa Cruz, Riverside)
 University of Michigan (Ann Arbor)
 University of North Carolina at Chapel Hill
 University of Texas at Austin
 University of Vermont (Burlington)
 University of Virginia (Charlottesville)

Runners-up
As part of the initial 1985 publication, Moll also selected nine "worthy runner-up" universities:
 University of Colorado Boulder
 Georgia Institute of Technology (Atlanta)
 University of Illinois Urbana–Champaign
 New College of Florida (formerly New College of the University of South Florida, it became an independent part of Florida's State University System in 2001)
 Pennsylvania State University (University Park)
 University of Pittsburgh
 State University of New York at Binghamton (also known as Binghamton University)
 University of Washington (Seattle)
 University of Wisconsin–Madison

Notable updates

Greenes' Guides list (2001) 
The list of "public ivy" institutions has gone through several revisions over the years, much like other university rankings and conferences. A notable update was published in 2001, when Howard and Matthew Greene included the following 30 colleges and universities in The Public Ivies: America's Flagship Public Universities.

Northeastern 

 Pennsylvania State University (University Park)
 Rutgers University (New Brunswick)
 State University of New York at Binghamton
 University of Connecticut (Storrs)

Mid-Atlantic 

 College of William & Mary (Williamsburg, Virginia)
 University of Delaware (Newark)
 University of Maryland, College Park
 University of Virginia (Charlottesville)

Western 

 University of Arizona (Tucson)
 University of California, Berkeley
 University of California, Davis
 University of California, Irvine
 University of California, Los Angeles
 University of California, San Diego
 University of California, Santa Barbara
 University of Colorado Boulder
 University of Washington (Seattle)

Great Lakes & Midwest 

 Indiana University Bloomington
 Miami University (Oxford, Ohio)
 Michigan State University (East Lansing)
 Ohio State University (Columbus)
 University of Illinois Urbana-Champaign
 University of Iowa (Iowa City)
 University of Michigan (Ann Arbor)
 University of Minnesota, Twin Cities
 University of Wisconsin–Madison

Southern 

 University of Florida (Gainesville)
 University of Georgia (Athens)
 University of North Carolina at Chapel Hill
 University of Texas at Austin

Gallery

See also
 Colonial colleges
 Flagship universities

References

Universities and colleges in the United States
Ivy League
Colloquial terms for groups of universities and colleges